North Karelia (formerly Kuopio East) was an electoral district represented in the Finnish Eduskunta (parliament). In 2013 it was merged with Northern Savonia electoral district to form the Savonia-Karelia electoral district. It covered the administrative region of North Karelia, with a population of 169,722. North Karelia elected six members of the Eduskunta, when in 2005 there were still seven seats.

The constituency was largely rural, centred on the city of Joensuu. The largest party in the Finnish parliamentary elections has traditionally been the Centre Party.

The reduction of seats caused the Green League leader Tarja Cronberg to lose her seat in 2007 elections, even she got 11,7% and second the most votes in constituency.

Members of parliament

2017–2021

2003–2007
 Tarja Cronberg (VIHR)
 Hannu Hoskonen (Kesk.)
 Lauri Kähkönen (SDP)
 Esa Lahtela (SDP)
 Esko Mononen (vas.)
 Eero Reijonen (Kesk.)
 Säde Tahvanainen (SDP)
 Matti Väistö (Kesk.)

2007–2011
 Hannu Hoskonen (Kesk.)
 Lauri Kähkönen (SDP)
 Esa Lahtela (SDP)
 Pekka Ravi (Kok.)
 Eero Reijonen (Kesk.)
 Anu Vehviläinen (Kesk.)

Election results

|}

|}

References

See also
 Electoral districts of Finland

Parliament of Finland electoral districts
North Karelia